A cigar cutter is a mechanical device designed to cut one end off a cigar so that it may be properly smoked. Although some cigars are cut on both ends, or twirled at both ends, the vast majority come with one straight cut end and one end in a "cap" which must be cut off for the cigar to be smoked. Most quality handmade cigars, regardless of shape, will have a cap which is one or more small pieces of a wrapper pasted onto one end of the cigar with either a natural tobacco paste or with a mixture of flour and water.  The cap end of a cigar is the rounded end without the tobacco exposed, and this is the end one should always cut. The cap may be cut with a knife or bitten off, but if the cap is cut jaggedly or without care, the end of the cigar will not burn evenly and smokeable tobacco will be lost.

Types

There are three basic types :

 Guillotine (straight cut)
 Punch
 V-cut (a.k.a. notch cut, cat's eye, wedge cut, English cut)

Straight cut
The straight cut is the most common, usually used on cigars with a smaller ring gauge.  This cut uses a quick straight cut causing both ends of the cigar to be exposed. The double blade guillotine is preferred by many aficionados over the single blade, because it usually makes a cleaner cut. Cigar scissors are also used to make straight cuts, and may be the best choice for cutting the cigar with exactness. However, the guillotines are usually the most practical, the least expensive, and can be easily and safely carried in shirt or trouser pockets. Most prefer this cut because the entire cap end is exposed allowing for maximum smoke to exit with only minimum buildup occurring around the edge.

Punch cut
There are three basic types of cigar punches, a bullet punch, Havana punch, and multi-punch. The bullet punch is a bullet shaped device that fits on a keychain. The punch can be twisted to expose a circular blade, used to cut a hole in the cigar cap. This cut is preferred by some, as it exposes less of the filler and binder and reduces the chance of tobacco ending up in the mouth. Critics of this cut maintain that the smaller hole does not allow as much smoke to come out and the hole is often clogged with a saliva and tobacco buildup. One problem associated with these otherwise handy, durable and inexpensive devices is that the unscrewable top is easy to lose, leaving the blade exposed in the user's pocket. "Havana punches" offer some of the same convenience but with more safety. Rather than an easy-to-lose top, the blade is recessed and springs out at the push of a button. Multi-punches offer different-sized punch holes for different sizes of cigars. Not Considered a Cigar Cutter, as it does not cut (action) but rather cores or punches.

V-cut

The last of the most common type of cuts is the V-cut. V-cutters look like guillotine cutters, but cut a wedge into the cigar cap rather than completely removing it, creating a clean-looking gash. The V-cutter was originally designed for pyramid shaped vitolas. This type of cut allows the smoker to get a deep cut into the V shaped cigar. Good V-cutters penetrate deeper into the filler than straight cutters, and some smokers prefer them for thicker gauge cigars too. However, cheap V-cutters can result in sloppy cuts too deep into the cigar, which result in an uneven burn.

History
Frederick William Fairholt, in 1859, describes an early cigar cutter as follows:

Fairholt also describes a variation on the cigar cutter watch fob:

Danger of injury
It is possible to receive a severe injury from a poorly handled cigar cutter. In 1999, basketball star Michael Jordan injured a finger with a cigar cutter which some believe led to his second retirement.

See also
 Nail cutter

See also
 Cigar
 List of cigar brands

References

External links

Cutter
Cutting tools
Tobacciana